Benjamin Čolić (born 23 July 1991) is a Bosnian professional footballer who plays as a right-back for Czech First League club Dynamo České Budějovice.

Čolić started his professional career at Željezničar, spending six years at the club, before joining Čelik Zenica in 2015. He then left Čelik and signed with Zrinjski Mostar in 2016. Later that year, he joined Olimpik. In July 2017, Čolić signed with Czech First League club Karviná. In the summer of 2019, he was transferred to Dynamo České Budějovice.

Čolić also represented the Bosnia and Herzegovina national team in 2011.

Club career

Early career
Born in Sarajevo, SFR Yugoslavia, Čolić started his professional career at hometown club Željezničar in 2009. He played for the club all the way until 2015, making over 100 appearances for Željezničar and winning five trophies (three league titles and two cups).

Čolić left Željezničar in June 2015 and shortly after signed a contract with Čelik Zenica. After Čelik, he played for Zrinjski Mostar, winning one more league title, and Olimpik.

Karviná
On 17 July 2017, Čolić signed a two-year contract with Czech First League club Karviná. Less than a month later, he made his official debut for Karviná in a 1–1 home draw against Mladá Boleslav on 13 August 2017. He left the club after two years, in June 2019.

Dynamo České Budějovice
Shortly after leaving Karviná, Čolić signed a contract with Dynamo České Budějovice on 18 June 2019. His first game for Dynamo was in a 1–0 home defeat against Opava on 14 July 2019. Čolić scored his first goal for the club in a league game on 4 August 2019, a 1–1 home draw against Jablonec.

International career
Čolić was part of the Bosnia and Herzegovina U19 and U21 national teams.

On 16 December 2011, he made an appearance for the Bosnia and Herzegovina national team in a 1–0 friendly loss against Poland.

Career statistics

Club

International

Honours
Željezničar
Bosnian Premier League: 2009–10, 2011–12, 2012–13
Bosnian Cup: 2010–11, 2011–12

Zrinjski Mostar
Bosnian Premier League: 2015–16

References

External links

Benjamin Čolić at Sofascore

1991 births
Living people
Footballers from Sarajevo
Bosnia and Herzegovina footballers
Bosnia and Herzegovina expatriate footballers
Expatriate footballers in the Czech Republic
Premier League of Bosnia and Herzegovina players
Czech First League players
FK Željezničar Sarajevo players
NK Čelik Zenica players
HŠK Zrinjski Mostar players
FK Olimpik players
MFK Karviná players
SK Dynamo České Budějovice players
Bosnia and Herzegovina youth international footballers
Bosnia and Herzegovina under-21 international footballers
Association football fullbacks
Bosnia and Herzegovina expatriate sportspeople in the Czech Republic